The Vernon O. Underwood Stakes is an American Thoroughbred horse race held annually at Hollywood Park Racetrack in Inglewood, California. Raced in late November, the Grade III event is open to horses age three and older. It is contested on Cushion Track synthetic dirt at a distance of six furlongs.

Inaugurated as the National Sprint Championship Stakes, in 1990 the name was changed to honor Vernon O. Underwood (1907–1990), a California businessman. After Hollywood Park closed, the race is run as the Midnight Lute Stakes at Santa Anita Park.

In 2001, H. Eugene Reed's eight-year-old gelding Men's Exclusive became the first back-to-back winner of the race and its oldest winner.

The race was run in two divisions in 1981, 1982, 1984,1986,and in 2016

Records
Speed  record:
 1:07.79 - Sailors Sunset (2006) (new track record on Cushion Track)

Most wins:
 2 - Men's Exclusive (2000, 2001)

Most wins by a trainer:
 3 - John W. Sadler (1989, 1990, 2010)

Winners since 1989

Earlier winners

1988 - Gallant Sailor
1987 - Hilco Scamper
1986 - Bedside Promise
1986 - Nasib
1985 - Pancho Villa
1984 - Fifty Six Ina Row
1984 - Lovlier Linda
1983 - Fighting Fit
1982 - Mad Key
1982 - Unpredictable
1981 - Shanekite
1981 - Smokite

References

 Sailors Sunset record win in the 2006 Vernon O. Underwood Stakes at Bloodhorse.com
 2008 Vernon O. Underwood Stakes preview at the NTRA

Graded stakes races in the United States
Open sprint category horse races
Horse races in California
Hollywood Park Racetrack
Recurring sporting events established in 1981
1981 establishments in California